Maya and the Wave is an American documentary film, directed by Stephanie Johnes and released in 2022. The film is a portrait of surfer Maya Gabeira and her struggles to be taken seriously as a woman in a male-dominated sport, focusing in part on the role that sexism played in the response to her injuries while trying to surf a giant wave at Praia do Norte in 2013.

The film premiered at the 2022 Toronto International Film Festival on September 9, 2022, and was first runner-up for the People's Choice Award for Documentaries.

References

External links

2022 films
2022 documentary films
American sports documentary films
2020s American films
Documentary films about surfing
Documentary films about women's sports
American surfing films
Women's sport in Portugal